Idara Otu (born 5 July 1987, Atlanta, US) is a Nigerian sprinter. She competed in the 4 × 400 m relay event at the 2012 Summer Olympics.

She is also the founder of the Let Girls Read, Run, Grow Foundation, that provides underserved girls  necessary resources to succeed in life through programming in education, sport and agriculture and hopes to provide the world's next group of leaders.

References

External links
Let Girls Read, Run, Grow Foundation

Track and field athletes from Atlanta
Nigerian female sprinters
1987 births
Living people
Olympic athletes of Nigeria
Athletes (track and field) at the 2012 Summer Olympics
American people of Nigerian descent
Olympic female sprinters